James Robinson McCormick (August 1, 1824 – May 19, 1897) was a United States Representative from Missouri.

Born near Irondale, Washington County, Missouri, McCormick attended public schools in Washington County, Missouri. He received private instruction and entered Transylvania University, Lexington, Kentucky, as a medical student. He graduated from the Memphis (Tennessee) Medical College in 1849 and commenced practice in Wayne County, Missouri. He moved to Perry County in 1850 and continued the practice of medicine.

He served as a delegate to the state constitutional convention in 1861. During the Civil War he served as a surgeon in the Sixth Regiment, Missouri Volunteer Infantry, Union Army. He served in the Missouri State Senate in 1862, but resigned on account of duties in the Army.
He became a brigadier general of militia in 1863. After the war he located in Arcadia, Missouri, and resumed the practice of medicine. He again served in the state senate in 1866, but resigned the following year.

McCormick was elected as a Democratic Representative for Missouri's 3rd congressional district to the Fortieth Congress to fill the vacancy caused by the death of Thomas E. Noell. He was reelected to the Forty-first and Forty-second Congresses and served from December 17, 1867, to March 3, 1873. He was not a candidate for reelection in 1872.

He moved to Farmington, Missouri, in 1874 where he practiced medicine and engaged in the pharmaceutical business. He died in Farmington, St. Francois County, Missouri, May 19, 1897. He was interred in Masonic Cemetery.

References

1824 births
1897 deaths
Transylvania University alumni
Union militia generals
Union Army officers
Democratic Party members of the United States House of Representatives from Missouri
Democratic Party Missouri state senators
People from Farmington, Missouri
19th-century American politicians
People from Jefferson County, Washington